Trabajadores ( workers) is a Cuban trade union newspaper.

Founded in 1970 by Osvaldo de Melo and Sara del Carmen Zaldívar, Trabajadores operates under the auspices of the Central de Trabajadores de Cuba (CTC).

Trabajadores is published in Spanish, with an on-line English edition. It presents itself as newsletter for trade union members and blue collar workers.

History
In early June 1970, de Melo and Zaldivar started Los Trabajadores, a tabloid, at the request of the general secretary of CTC, Hector Ramos Latour. The CTC needed to replace its previous publications,  Vanguardia Obrera and the Revista CTC.  Los Trabajadores produced editions in June, July and November 1970.

In the beginning, Los Trabajadores did not have a building for writing, printing,. workshops and editing staff. Members of the Unión de Periodistas de Cuba (Cuban Journalist Union), including national organizer, Lázara Rodríguez Alemán, assisted with the first editions.  The print shop was located in Virtues and Manrique in Central Havana.

The original Los Trabajadores staff included de Melo, head of the Press Section of the CTC,  Zaldívar, chief of information; Mario Castillo and Lucas Tarragó, journalists, and Rolando Montalván, Ángel Lazo and Rodolfo Amiama, photographers. Guillermo Hernández managed the printing with the assistance of Orlando Núñez and workers from the newspaper El Mundo.

Los Trabajadores published articles on the labor movement, the sugar harvest, the internal life of unions, the practice of proletarian internationalism and class solidarity. It was distributed free in worker meetings and in workplaces. In November 1974, vendors started selling Los Trabajadores in Havana..

In 1978, Trabajadores began printing issues  times a week and on 2 December 1980 it became a daily. In 1997, Trabajadores created its own website.

Formal aspects
In the beginning Trabajadores was a twelve-page tabloid with a print run never more than three thousand copies, which left irregularly until he could be biweekly. In 1975 it acquired the broadsheet, with six pages, and color only in the first and the last, justified to four and six columns, either. The identifier of the CTC, later removed, appeared to the left of the head.

Research by students of the Institute of Design (ISDI in Spanish) on early issues of Trabajadores showed that "The body text typeface had no formal or conceptual basis, as their selection was subject to the availability of types in the workshop, for holders was the Futura. The pictures are rounded vertices.
"The structure of the front favored their visibility on the streets, because the photos were the top stories on the top half of the newspaper, was generally organized, yet traditional, and the information was in good ranking."In 1977 Trabajadores initiated the use of fillets, chain lines and boxes, to separate the news, and even dabbled in infographics as a means of enriching the information. In March 1978, the publisher reduced the number of photos on the first page, the information was ranked according to their importance, and was used to separate target.

According to the ISDI students concluded that the 1979 issues remained "the same characteristics of the previous year, except his head, which again is changed in April this year (...)"
"It was took up the fillets and Watermarks. Combined in the body text, serif and sans serif, and holders inside are starting to use type’s displays. Increases the number of images per page."On December 2, 1980, Trabajadores became a daily. According to the ISDI students, the paper began the use of orange to the head, which moved within the page. Also in the front the font was used only sans serif, but not in the other. There was an increased use of text images, and the body of the first cartoons was inserted.

Electronic edition
On 28 April 1997, Trabajadores introduced its online edition.

It has a very basic structure, held in Front page by Víctor Fernández, specialist in scientific-technical information. it had sections of national, international, culture, sports, health and then matching section with readers, reproduced with the same name in 2009 Section.

The digital edition became a daily paper on June 14, 2000. Until then it was still assimilating published in print, and was updated at night by a computer specialist.

in 2000 Alina Martínez Tria became manager and editor  Trabajadores began to include agencies cables.  The paper provided heavy coverage of the Elián González controversy in the United States.

The paper employed a chief editor, three operators, two of them dedicated to the update in the morning, on alternate days, and the third from Tuesday to Friday afternoons, two editors who worked on alternate days and two correctors with equal labor system. Amounted to a total of eight people.

By then the digital edition already had an English version and a translator hired to translate texts themselves, primarily those published in print.

Latest changes 
The Trabajadores paper design changed in 2002, with the collaboration of Andro Perez Diz-time student at the Institute of Design (ISDI) with the aim of better organizing the content and special spaces. In 2003, changes were made to the sections and the information architecture. In June 2007, Trabajadores introduced the automated content management Plone and design totally changed. This work was undertaken by engineers at the University of Information Science (UCI in Spanish).

Under these conditions envisaged a team composed of a chief editor, two publishers and two editors working on alternate days, an interactive editor to attend forums and polls, a graphical editor responsible with the introduction of infographics, multimedia, galleries and Bulletin attention, and two managing partners dedicated to information needed for special work in coordination with the documentation center, work positioning and statistics, then one of them moved from job.

Trabajadores regularly sections

 "Nacionales" – national news of interest for workers.
 "Buzón Abierto" – articles motivated by letters of readers and answers of government agencies.
 "Salud" – articles about health issues.
 "Sin pausa" – articles related to update process of economic and social model.
 "Cultura" – news, interviews and opinion articles about arts and literacy.
 "Al pan, pan" – cultural reviews.
 "Deportes" – news, interviews and opinion articles about sports.
 "Internacionales" – international news and articles
 "Visión sindical" – short news related to workplace.

External links 
 Trabajadores Digital 

Newspapers published in Cuba
Publications with year of establishment missing
Mass media in Havana